Víctor Ulloa (born 4 March 1992) is a Mexican professional footballer who plays as a defensive midfielder for Major League Soccer club Inter Miami. He began his career in the FC Dallas academy, and was signed to the Major League Soccer pro team as a homegrown player in 2010. He made his debut for Dallas in 2011, and played there for eight years before being traded to FC Cincinnati.

Early life
Víctor Ulloa was born on 4 March 1992 in Chihuahua, Mexico to Guillermina and Evaristo Ulloa. He has a younger sister, Anahi, and a younger brother Ivan, both of whom are more than ten years younger than him. Ulloa grew up in Wylie, Texas.

Career

On 30 July 2010, Ulloa was signed by FC Dallas as a homegrown player along with Moises Hernandez and Ruben Luna. However, he wasn't eligible to play for the first team until the 2011 season.  On 23 October 2011, Ulloa made his professional debut in Dallas' 4–2 loss in their final regular season match of 2011 on the road against the San Jose Earthquakes. He did not appear in any MLS games the next two seasons. After being released by the club following the 2013 season, Ulloa re-joined the club after impressing new head coach Óscar Pareja (who was also his coach in the FC Dallas Academy) during training camp for the 2014 season. During the season, he established himself as a regular starter at defensive midfielder.

On 12 December 2018, MLS expansion side FC Cincinnati announced that they had signed Ulloa in exchange for $150,000 in General Allocation Money, with another $100,000 to be paid if Ulloa met certain performance metrics.

On 11 November 2019, Inter Miami acquired Ulloa from FC Cincinnati in exchange for $50,000 in General Allocation Money, and a 2020 MLS SuperDraft third-round selection. The club's also exchanged places in the 2019 MLS Re-Entry Draft. Following the 2021 season, Ulloa's contract option was declined by Miami. On 12 December 2021, Ulloa re-signed with Miami on a contract through to 2024.

Career statistics

Club

Honours
FC Dallas
Lamar Hunt U.S. Open Cup: 2016
Supporters' Shield: 2016

References

External links

 
 

1992 births
Living people
Mexican expatriate footballers
FC Cincinnati players
FC Dallas players
Inter Miami CF players
Association football midfielders
Sportspeople from Ciudad Juárez
Footballers from Chihuahua
Expatriate soccer players in the United States
Major League Soccer players
Homegrown Players (MLS)
Soccer players from Texas
People from Wylie, Texas
Mexican footballers